Waterfall is the fourth album released for the American market by the English jazz rock band If. It was first issued in 1972 and reached #195 on the Billboard Pop Albums Chart.

It is a rearranged version of If 4, containing two tracks, "Paint Your Pictures" and "Cast No Shadows", in substitution of "You in Your Small Corner" and "Svenska Soma", which had been released on IF 4. The original recording line-up was modified to include two new members, Cliff Davies and Dave Wintour, who filled the drum and bass chairs in substitution of Dennis Elliott and Jim Richardson, respectively.

The album was recorded in London at Command Studios in February and at Morgan Studios in July 1972.

Track listing
 "Waterfall" (D. Morrissey, B. Morrissey) – 5:42
 "The Light Still Shines" (Quincy, Humphrey) – 5:06
 "Sector 17" (Quincy) – 8:00
 "Paint Your Pictures" (D. Morrissey, B. Morrissey) – 5:18
  "Cast No Shadows" (Davies) – 7:30
 "Throw Myself to the Wind" (D. Morrissey, B. Morrissey) – 4:42

Bonus tracks on CD release from 2003:
 "You in Your Small Corner" (Humphries, Quincy) – 3:28
 "Waterfall" (Morrissey, Morrissey) – 4:02
 "Waterfall" (Morrissey, Morrissey) – 4:00

Personnel
 Cliff Davies – drums
 Dennis Elliott – drums
 J.W. Hodgkinson – vocals, percussion
 John Mealing – piano, organ
 Dick Morrissey – saxophones, flute, vocals
 Dave Quincy – saxophones
 Jim Richardson – bass
 Terry Smith – guitar
 Dave Wintour – electric guitar & acoustic guitar, bass, vocals

References 

1973 albums
If (band) albums
Island Records albums
Albums recorded at Morgan Sound Studios